Via Monte Napoleone, also spelled Via Montenapoleone, is an upscale shopping street in Milan, Italy, Europe's most expensive street (2022) and the third most expensive street in the world . It is famous for its ready-to-wear fashion and jewelry shops, and for being the most important street of the Milan fashion district known as the Quadrilatero della moda, where many well-known fashion designers have high-end boutiques. The most exclusive Italian shoemakers maintain boutiques on this street.

In 2009, architect Fabio Novembre designed a months-long art installation, titled Per fare un albero, ‘To make a tree’ in conjunction with the city of Milan's Department of Design, Events and Fashion and Fiat — featuring 20 full-size fiberglass planter replicas of the company's 500C cabriolet along Via Monte Napoleone.

In 2002, the Street Association started a media project including the Radio and the Portal, in order to relaunch the Made in Italy brand. Sponsored by the Department of Fashion, Tourism and Major Events of the Municipality of Milan, Italy Fashion System, and Assomoda, today it is the first instrument of revival and information on Made in Italy worldwide.

History
The street traces the Roman city walls erected by Emperor Maximian. In 1783, a financial institution known as the Monte Camerale di Santa Teresa opened there in Palazzo Marliani, with the function of managing the public debt. In 1786 the street itself was named after the monte. The bank was closed in 1796 but re-opened in 1804, when Milan was capital of the Napoleonic Italian Republic, as the Monte Napoleone: from this the street derived its current name. During the first part of the 19th century the street was almost entirely rebuilt in the Neoclassical manner with palaces inhabited by the highest of the aristocracy. Notable buildings from this period are the Palazzo Melzi di Cusano, the Palazzo Gavazzi, the Casa Carcassola Grandi, and the Palazzetto Taverna. The much earlier Palazzo Marliani however, regarded as one of the finest houses to survive from the era of the Sforza, was preserved until its destruction during the Allied bombing campaign of 1943.

After World War II, Via Monte Napoleone became one of the leading streets in international fashion, somewhat equivalent to Paris' Rue du Faubourg-Saint-Honoré, Rome's Via Condotti, London's Bond Street and Oxford Street, Los Angeles' Rodeo Drive, Florence's Via de' Tornabuoni, Berlin's Kurfürstendamm and New York's Fifth Avenue.

Caffè Cova, founded in 1817 and one of the city's oldest cafés and confectioners, relocated to Via Monte Napoleone in 1950 from its original premises next to the Teatro alla Scala.

Gallery

See also

List of upscale shopping districts

References

External links

Jewellery districts
Culture in Milan
Tourist attractions in Milan
Shopping districts and streets in Italy
Streets in Milan